is a Japanese politician of the Liberal Democratic Party, a member of the House of Representatives in the Diet (national legislature). A native of Tokyo and graduate of Keio University, he was elected for the first time in 1979. He served as Minister of Education in 1990 and as Minister of Internal Affairs and Communications from 1999 to 2000.

Hori was appointed as head of the LDP's Policy Research Council on August 1, 2008.

References 

 

Education ministers of Japan
Government ministers of Japan
Members of the House of Representatives (Japan)
Keio University alumni
People from Tokyo
Living people
1934 births
Liberal Democratic Party (Japan) politicians
21st-century Japanese politicians
Politicians from Tokyo